Cristiana Oprea (born 11 March 1992) is a Romanian rally driver. She currently competes in the all-electric rally series Opel Cup 2022 and the FIA Balkan European Rally Trophy. Cristiana is the first Romanian woman driver to ever compete in the World Rally Championship and European Rally Championship. Her career in rallying started in 2015, first as a codriver next to George Grigorescu, then as a driver in DACIA Cup, driving a Dacia Sandero 0.9 TCe.

She previously competed in the Romanian National Rally Championship and in the European Rally Championship. In July 2018 she and codriver Diana Hațegan became the first Romanian female rally crew in the last 50 years to compete in a foreign rally (Rally Sliven, Bulgaria, a FIA European Rally Trophy event).

In July 2019 she and codriver Diana Hațegan became the first ladies crew to ever represent Romania in the FIA ERC European Rally Championship, at Rally di Roma Capitale, where they gained maximum points in the ERC Ladies Trophy standings driving a Peugeot 208 R2.

In April 2022, Cristiana Oprea made her WRC debut at 2022 Croatia Rally and became the first Romanian woman driver to ever compete in the World Rally Championship.

Biography

Studies, career and motorsport debut 
Oprea is a double graduate of the "Ion Mincu" University of Architecture and Urbanism in Bucharest. She studied Urban Planning (2010-2014) and Architecture (2011-2017), but she never worked in the field, wanting to follow her passion for cars. In 2015 she was for a short while the PR of the Romanian Motorsport Federation, when she first took contact with the motorsport world. Her career in rallying started in 2015, first as a codriver next to George Grigorescu, Master of Sport and founder of the DACIA Cup series, then as a driver in DACIA Cup, driving a Dacia Sandero 0.9 TCe.

Motorsport Excellence Centre Bucharest 
In 2017, Oprea created the concept for a Motorsport Excellence Centre in Bucharest as an architecture graduation project.

Racing career 
Cristiana Oprea competed 2 full seasons (2017 - 2018) in DACIA Cup, part of the Romanian National Rally Championship. Her rookie season was 2017, when she completed 7 events driving a Dacia Sandero 0.9 TCe with Ioana Stan as a codriver. They finished on 6th place out of 9 rookie crew and on 12th place out of 18 crews enlisted overall in DACIA Cup. In 2018 she finished on the 5th place overall in DACIA Cup, marking the best result of a woman driver since 2007, when Alina Bunica competed.

Oprea first stepped on a podium at the beginning of 2019 season at Argeș Rally, when together with codriver Diana Hațegan took second place overall in DACIA Cup.

In July 2019 she and codriver Diana Hațegan became the first ladies crew to ever represent Romania in the FIA ERC European Rally Championship, at Rally di Roma Capitale, where they finished P8 in the highly competitive ERC3 class and gained maximum points in the ERC Ladies Trophy standings.

In April 2022, Cristiana Oprea and codriver Andrei Mitrașcă competed in the World Rally Championship at 2022 Croatia Rally.

Romanian Women in Motorsport platform 
Oprea is the founder and administrator of "Femei în Motorsport", a platform dedicated to promoting all women involved in Romanian motorsport, following the Women in Motorsport concept as defined by FIA.

References

External links
 Official website
 Cristiana Oprea's ewrc profile

1992 births
Romanian rally drivers
Female rally drivers
European Rally Championship drivers
World Rally Championship drivers
Living people

FIA Motorsport Games drivers